Gömeç is a town and district of Balıkesir Province in the Marmara region of Turkey. Its former name was Armutova before becoming a district. The ancient city Kisthene is located in Gömeç. The population is 4988 (as of 2010). Current mayor's name is Mehmet Irem Himam (CHP).

Twin towns — sister cities
Gömeç is twinned with:

 Donji Vakuf, Bosnia and Herzegovina since 2002

References

Populated places in Balıkesir Province
Populated coastal places in Turkey
Districts of Balıkesir Province